The 8th Central Committee of the Communist Party of Vietnam (CPV) was elected at the 8th CPV National Congress. It elected the 8th Politburo and the 8th Secretariat.

Plenums
The Central Committee (CC) is not a permanent institution. Instead, it convenes plenary sessions between party congresses. When the CC is not in session, decision-making powers are delegated to its internal bodies; that is, the Politburo and the Secretariat. None of these organs are permanent bodies either; typically, they convene several times a month.

Composition

References

Bibliography
 
 
 
 

8th Central Committee of the Communist Party of Vietnam